Melatonin is Jonathan Seet's first album, released independently in 2000.

Track listing
 "Just Like Me" – 4:12
 "I Miss You" – 5:28
 "Fade, My Angel" – 5:35
 "Methadone" – 4:39
 "Small Craft" – 5:31
 "Portrait" – 4:10
 "Miss 2" – 1:47
 "Superstar" – 3:51
 "Evergreen" – 5:02
 "Rubber Lips" – 4:00
 "Heart Attack" – 7:26

Jonathan Seet albums
2000 debut albums